Miguel José Pérez (April 7, 1937 – July 16, 2005) was a Puerto Rican professional wrestler who was best known for his tag team with Antonino Rocca.

Career

Montreal Athletic Commission (1954–1957) 
Pérez started his professional wrestling career in 1954 at the age of 17. He debuted on October 15, 1954 and wrestled for Montreal Athletic Commission in his early days. He was the MAC World Heavyweight Champion. He left the company in 1957.

Madison Square Garden (1957–1968) 
In 1957, Pérez formed a tag team with popular wrestling star Antonino Rocca. They both wrestled in the famed Madison Square Garden on a regular basis. Pérez and Rocca captured the NWA World Tag Team Championship and were the first recognized champions in the ancestry of Capitol Wrestling Corporation, now known as WWE.

While Rocca left the company in 1963, and Pérez appeared in other areas, he was a regular on the undercard at Madison Square Garden through March 1968, when he pinned Crazy Luke Graham in less than 25 seconds in his final appearance.  Some of his matches include 1964 wins over Lou Bastein, Lou Albano, and Bull Johnson; draws with Tony Marino, and then Red Bastein; with Pedro Morales teamed to lose to U.S. tagteam champs Dr. Jerry and Crazy Luke Graham, but came back to defeat Magnificent Maurice and Klondike Bill.  Pérez won on disqualification over manager Bobby Davis, then teamed with
Haystacks Calhoun to defeat Davis and Gorilla Monsoon.
In February 1968, he pinned Crazy Luke Graham in 18 seconds in the new Garden.

World Wrestling Council (1974–1981) 
In 1974, Pérez joined the World Wrestling Council in Puerto Rico on January 6, 1974 as José Miguel Pérez. He was billed as the first WWC Puerto Rico Champion and it was the first show of WWC. He lost the title to Dr. Klodied on March 8, 1975. He defeated Klodied just two weeks later to get his second Puerto Rico title.

The title was held up on August 30 when Pérez had a match with Spoiler II. He won a tournament on September 20 and got his third Puerto Rico Heavyweight title. He lost the title to Tosh Togo on October 4. He would return teaming with former partner in CWC, Antonino Rocca. They both together captured the WWC North American Tag Team Championship on September 11, 1976 by defeating Los Infernos.

They lost the titles to Higo Hamaguchi and Gordon Nelson on October 16. He was still the partner of Rocca and they both wrestled as a tag team until March 15, 1977 when Rocca died. Pérez started to compete on singles. On May 7, 1977, Pérez captured his fourth and final Puerto Rico Heavyweight title by defeating Hurricane Castillo in a tournament final.

Just one week later, he lost the title to Castillo on May 14 in a rematch. Pérez still wrestled for WWC. He was injured on February 27, 1979 in a match against José Rivera. He was forced to retire from professional wrestling on March 6 because he was not able to wrestle. Though four months later on July 28, at Bayamon, he teamed up with Jack Veneno to take on the team of Hiro Sasaki and Kengo Kimura only for Veneno and Pérez to lose the match.  After this, he retired for four years as a professional wrestler until he returned at WWC Anniversary on September 17, 1983, at the Hiram Bithorn Stadium in San Juan, Puerto Rico to take on Barrabas and defeated him. The next year at WWC Anniversary on September 14, at the same venue, saw Pérez's final match against Leo Burke and Burke defeated him. After this match, he retired as a professional wrestler for good.

Later years 
Miguel Pérez, Sr. returned in 1985 for an angle, where he appeared as a photographer at ring side taking pictures and scouting opponents before Miguel Pérez Jr. debut match. Pérez Sr. showed up during a match between Eric Embry and a jobber. Embry went to ring side and attacked Miguel Pérez, Sr with camera in hand and Miguel Pérez, Jr came to his father's rescue. This eventually lead to Pérez Jr debut match. Managed Mighty Igor in WWC. He came back in February 1992 and got involved in a feud with El Profe. In his last match, he beat El Profe in a hair vs. mask match. For the next several of years he made more appearances in WWC and the International Wrestling Association. On July 16, 2005, Pérez died of a massive heart attack.

Championships and accomplishments 
 Montreal Athletic Commission
 MAC World Heavyweight Champion (1 time) 

 Capitol Wrestling Corporation/Worldwide Wrestling Federation/World Wrestling Federation
 NWA World Tag Team Championship (Northeast version) (1 time) - with Antonino Rocca
 NWA United States Tag Team Championship (Northeast version) (1 time) - with Antonino Rocca

 World Wrestling Council
 WWC Puerto Rico Championship (4 times)
 WWC North American Tag Team Championship (3 times) - with Carlos Colón (2) and Antonino Rocca (1)

See also
Professional wrestling in Puerto Rico

External links 
 Miguel Perez Profile at OWW

1937 births
2005 deaths
Puerto Rican male professional wrestlers
People from Santurce, Puerto Rico
Professional wrestling managers and valets
Stampede Wrestling alumni
20th-century professional wrestlers
WWC Puerto Rico Champions